The following highways are numbered 613:

Canada
Alberta Highway 613
 Ontario Highway 613

Costa Rica
 National Route 613

United States

Brazil
SP-613 São Paulo state

Saudi Arabia
Dhahran–Jubail Expressway (Highway 613)